The Abidjan Ivory Coast Temple is a temple of the Church of Jesus Christ of Latter-day Saints under construction.
The intent to construct the temple was announced by church president Thomas S. Monson on April 5, 2015, during the Sunday morning session of the church's general conference. The Bangkok Thailand and Port-au-Prince Haiti temples were announced at the same time.

On November 8, 2018, a groundbreaking ceremony to signify the beginning of construction took place, with Neil L. Andersen presiding. Marcus B. Nash and Edward Dube, general authority seventies, and Daniel Kablan Duncan the country's vice president and former prime minister of the Ivory Coast also participated in the groundbreaking.

See also

 Comparison of temples of The Church of Jesus Christ of Latter-day Saints
 List of temples of The Church of Jesus Christ of Latter-day Saints
 List of temples of The Church of Jesus Christ of Latter-day Saints by geographic region
 Temple architecture (Latter-day Saints)

References

External links
 Official Church Temples Site

Temples (LDS Church) in Africa
Christianity in Ivory Coast
Religious buildings and structures in Ivory Coast
Buildings and structures in Abidjan
Proposed buildings and structures in Ivory Coast
Temples (LDS Church) completed in 2005